Al Dair is a village in Bahrain on the northern coast of Muharraq Island. It lies north of the Bahrain International Airport, and north west of Samaheej village.

Before the discovery of oil in Bahrain, most of the inhabitants were involved in farming, especially date palms, and fishing.

Similarly to Deir ez-Zor in Syria, The name Ad-Dair is Aramaic for "the monastery," indicating the Christian past of Muharraq Island.

It’s inhabitants are mostly Shi’ite though there are a small number of Sunni Muslims who are present.

Education
The Ministry of Education operates government schools in Al-Dair, Al-Dair Primary Intermediate Girls School and Al-Dair Primary Boys School.

References

Dair